Terra Lightfoot (born August, 1986) is a Canadian musician and singer-songwriter from Hamilton, Ontario who has released four albums with the independent music label Sonic Unyon Recording Company and is distributed by Universal Music Group in Canada and The Orchard outside of Canada. She performs in a folk and roots rock style known for bold vocals and electric guitar riffs.

Early life 
Lightfoot was raised in Waterdown, Ontario, a rural community in the northern part of Hamilton, and attended McMaster University.

Early career 
In the early 2010s Lightfoot was a member of the Dinner Belles, a group of country-folk performers from Hamilton. She performed as a guitarist and vocalist for the group's 2014 studio album The River and the Willow, having previously appeared on their self-released 2011 debut West Simcoe County.

Through indie music label, Sonic Unyon, Lightfoot released her first solo album, self-titled and released in 2011, was described as "subdued", with compositions characteristic of a modern folk singer-songwriter. 

Her second solo album,  2014's Every Time My Mind Runs Wild, saw her collaborate with indie rockers Gus van Go, Werner F, and Liam O'Neil (known for his performances with the group The Stills).  The album's producers, van Go and F, were credited with bringing a more catchy, hook-heavy, power pop style.

In 2017, Terra Lightfoot released two new albums. In February she released orchestral collaboration Live in Concert. In late summer, Lightfoot released "Paradise," the lead single from her third studio album, New Mistakes. The record earned praise from critics at No Depression, Pop Matters, Guitar Player, Twangville, and The Boot.

New Mistakes earned Lightfoot a nomination for a 2018 JUNO Award for Adult Alternative Album of the Year. The album's single "Paradise" also earned producer van Go a 2018 JUNO nomination for Recording Engineer of the Year, as well as a long-list nomination for the 2018 Polaris Music Prize.

In August 2020, Lightfoot released a new single, "Paper Thin Walls," from her fourth studio album, Consider the Speed. That album was released on October 16, 2020.

Musical style 
Lightfoot has a multi-octave mezzo-soprano singing voice that has been compared to that of Joan Jett and Dusty Springfield. Her electric guitar style has been described as similar to John Fogerty and Van Morrison. The songs for which Lightfoot is best known are described as bluesy-rock power ballads.

March 2018 Lightfoot was featured in Guitar Player Magazine along with her SG 'Veronica'.

Touring 
Lightfoot has toured extensively in the United States, Canada, and the United Kingdom, performing at folk music festivals and intimate venues.  In 2017 she was honoured by the Canadian Independent Music Association for being a touring musician selling at least 25,000 concert seats in a 12-month period.

While touring her 2017 album New Mistakes, Lightfoot also created, curated, and co-headlined The Longest Road Show, an all-female touring revue.

On tour, Lightfoot has collaborated with a famous Canadian singer forty years her senior, Gordon Lightfoot, though the two are not related. She has also toured with The Posies, Toad the Wet Sprocket,  Bruce Cockburn and Blue Rodeo. She supported Willie Nelson on the lone Canadian date of the 2018 Outlaw Music Festival.

Discography

Studio albums 
 Terra Lightfoot (2011)
 Every Time My Mind Runs Wild (2015)
 New Mistakes (2017)
 Consider the Speed (October 16, 2020)

Live albums 
 Live in Concert (2017)

References

External links 

Canadian folk singer-songwriters
Canadian women singer-songwriters
Musicians from Hamilton, Ontario
Living people
Canadian women rock singers
21st-century Canadian women singers
Sonic Unyon artists
1986 births